The Panepirotiko Stadio of Ioannina, more commonly known as Panepirotiko Stadio is a sports venue in Ioannina, Epirus, Greece.

Panepirotiko Stadio is part of the Panepirotiko Sports Center of the East, 50 games are held every year in various sports, it is open for use to the public and in amateur clubs as well as in sports activities and school championships. At Panepirotic Sports Center of the East, there 2 auxiliary football fields with natural turf, 2 mini football fields 5x5 with plastic turf, 5 outdoor basketball courts, 2 outdoor tennis courts and 2 indoor, 2 outdoor volleyball courts, 1 outdoor handball court, The only roller skating rink in Ioannina, Refreshment room - Canteen

Links
Profile at PEAKI.gr 
Panipeirotiko Stadium Profile at Stadia.gr

References

Football venues in Greece
Buildings and structures in Ioannina
Sports venues in Epirus